Emily Regan (born June 10, 1988, in Buffalo, New York) is an American rower. She is a three-time gold medalist at the World Rowing Championships and she won Olympic Gold in the Women's eight in 2016. She won a medal at the 2019 World Rowing Championships.

Rowing career

Education and background

Personal life
Regan contracted COVID-19 during the COVID-19 pandemic in the United States in April 2020. She subsequently recovered one month later.

References

External links
Emily Regan at USRowing

1988 births
Living people
American female rowers
Rowers from Buffalo, New York
World Rowing Championships medalists for the United States
Rowers at the 2016 Summer Olympics
Olympic gold medalists for the United States in rowing
Medalists at the 2016 Summer Olympics
21st-century American women